Neocabreria is a genus of Brazilian flowering plants in the tribe Eupatorieae within the family Asteraceae.

The genus is named in honor of Argentine botanist Angel L. Cabrera.

 Species
 Neocabreria catharinensis (Cabrera) R.M.King & H.Rob. - Santa Catarina
 Neocabreria malachophylla (Klatt) R.M.King & H.Rob.  - Paraná, Santa Catarina, Rio Grande do Sul, São Paulo
 Neocabreria pennivenia (B.L.Rob.) R.M.King & H.Rob. - Paraná, Minas Gerais
 Neocabreria serrulata (DC.) R.M.King & H.Rob. - Paraná, Santa Catarina, Rio Grande do Sul, Minas Gerais
 formerly included
Neocabreria concinna (DC.) R.M.King & H.Rob. - Eupatorium concinnum DC.

References

Asteraceae genera
Endemic flora of Brazil
Eupatorieae